The 1940 NAIA men's basketball tournament was held in March at Municipal Auditorium in Kansas City, Missouri. The 4th annual NAIA basketball tournament featured 32 teams playing in a single-elimination format. 

This year the National College Basketball Tournament (NCBT) changed its name to the National Association for Intercollegiate Basketball (NAIB).

The championship game featured Tarkio beating San Diego State, 52–42. San Diego State became the first team to lose back-to-back title games.

Awards and honors
Many of the records set by the 1940 tournament have been broken, and many of the awards were established much later:
Leading scorer est. 1963
Leading rebounder est. 1963
Charles Stevenson Hustle Award est. 1958
Coach of the Year est. 1954
Player of the Year est. 1994

Bracket

See also
 1940 NCAA basketball tournament
 1940 National Invitation Tournament

References

NAIA Men's Basketball Championship
Tournament
NAIA men's basketball tournament
 1940 in sports in Missouri